Slavicisms or Slavisms are words and expressions (lexical, grammatical, phonetic, etc.) borrowed or derived from Slavic languages.

Distribution

Southern languages 

Most languages of the former Soviet Union and of some neighbouring countries (for example, Mongolian) are significantly influenced by Russian, especially in vocabulary. The Romanian, Albanian, and Hungarian languages show the influence of the neighboring Slavic nations, especially in vocabulary pertaining to urban life, agriculture, and crafts and trade—the major cultural innovations at times of limited long-range cultural contact. In each one of these languages, Slavic lexical borrowings represent at least 15% of the total vocabulary. However, Romanian has much lower influence from Slavic than Albanian or Hungarian. This is potentially because Slavic tribes crossed and partially settled the territories inhabited by ancient Illyrians and Vlachs on their way to the Balkans.

Germanic languages 

Max Vasmer, a specialist in Slavic etymology, has claimed that there were no Slavic loans into Proto-Germanic. However, there are isolated Slavic loans (mostly recent) into other Germanic languages. For example, the word for "border" (in modern German , Dutch ) was borrowed from the Common Slavic granica. There are, however, many German placenames of West Slavic origin in Eastern Germany, notably Pommern, Schwerin, Rostock, Lübeck, Berlin, Leipzig and Dresden. English derives quark (a kind of cheese and subatomic particle) from the German , which in turn is derived from the Slavic tvarog, which means "curd". Many German surnames, particularly in Eastern Germany and Austria, are Slavic in origin.

The Scandinavian languages include words such as / (market place) from Old Russian  or Polish ,  (hops),
// (shrimp, prawn),
and, via Middle Low German,  (interpreter) from Old Slavic , and / (barge) from West Slavonic .

Uralic Languages 
There are a number of borrowed Slavic words in the Finnic languages, possibly as early as Proto-Finnic. Many loanwords have acquired a Finnicized form, making it difficult to say whether such a word is natively Finnic or Slavic.

To date, a huge number of Slavicisms are found in the Hungarian language (Finno-Ugric in origin). This is due to the fact that the Hungarian language was largely formed on the basis of the Slavic substratum of the former Principality of Pannonia.

Others 
The Czech word robot is now found in most languages worldwide, and the word pistol, probably also from Czech, is found in many European languages.

A well-known Slavic word in almost all European languages is vodka, a borrowing from Russian  – which itself was borrowed from Polish  (lit. "little water"), from common Slavic voda ("water", cognate to the English word) with the diminutive ending "-ka". Owing to the medieval fur trade with Northern Russia, Pan-European loans from Russian include such familiar words as sable. The English word "vampire" was borrowed (perhaps via French ) from German , in turn derived from Serbian , continuing Proto-Slavic *ǫpyrь, although Polish scholar K. Stachowski has argued that the origin of the word is early Slavic *vąpěrь, going back to Turkic oobyr. Several European languages, including English, have borrowed the word polje (meaning "large, flat plain") directly from the former Yugoslav languages (i.e. Slovene, Croatian, and Serbian). During the heyday of the USSR in the 20th century, many more Russian words became known worldwide: da, Soviet, sputnik, perestroika, glasnost, kolkhoz, etc. Another borrowing from Russian is samovar (lit. "self-boiling").

Inside the Slavic area 
Borrowings from one Slavic language to another are also noted within Slavic languages, for example, medieval polonisms and russicisms in the literary Ukrainian and Belarusian languages.

Following the baptism of Poland the Polish language was influenced by Czech brought by missionaries from the Kingdom of Bohemia.

Czech "wakers" (Czech: buditelé, "evocative") and Slovenian linguists of the late 19th century also turned to the Russian language in order to reslavicize their resurgent languages and clear them of foreign language borrowings. This was mainly due to the imposition of the German language on Slavic-speaking areas, and gave significant results (for example, the word vozduh ("air"), translated into Czech and Slovenian).

See also 
 Russianism — borrowing from the Russian language.
 Church Slavicism — a word or phrase borrowed from the Church Slavonic language.
 Bohemism — from the Czech language.
 Polonism — from the Polish language.
 Ukrainism — from the Ukrainian language.

References

External links

Bibliography 
 
 
 

Slavic languages
Lexicology
Slavic studies
Types of words
Etymology